The Ferguson P99 was a four-wheel drive Grand Prix car built by Ferguson Research Ltd. It was raced on behalf of the company by the Rob Walker Racing Team. Officially named as Ferguson Climax, it derived its P99 name from its Harry Ferguson Research project number. It used either a 1.5-litre or a 2.5-litre Climax engine. It remains the most famous example of its type as a result of its twin claims to fame: the first AWD car to win a Formula 1 event, and the last front-engined car to win a Formula 1 event.

History
Tony Rolt first considered the possibility of using Ferguson 4WD in circuit racing, and with Harry Ferguson keen to promote the 4WD transmission systems of Harry Ferguson Research, work began on the P99 in 1960. With a 50–50 torque distribution front to rear the car, Claude Hill's design was built to have an even weight distribution over both axles, which along with the position of the gearbox necessitated a front-engined design despite Cooper's and Lotus's overwhelming recent success with mid-engined cars. Just as the project was nearing completion it was dealt something of a body blow by the governing body's decision to reduce the size of F1 engines by 40% for 1961, making the extra weight of the AWD transmission a much bigger penalty. Nevertheless, the team persevered and fitted a standard 1.5-litre Climax 4-cylinder engine, mounted at a slant to make room for the front driveshaft. In addition the driving position was moved slightly off-centre to accommodate the gearbox and rear driveshaft to the driver's left hand side.

The car was first raced in the 1961 British Empire Trophy, where Rob Walker put Jack Fairman in the car, but the start was an inauspicious one as Fairman crashed on lap 2. In the British Grand Prix at Aintree, Fairman drove the car again, but surrendered it to Stirling Moss after his Walker-entered Lotus 18 failed. The car was disqualified for outside assistance on lap 56. The car's last major F1 race was its moment of motor racing immortality, as Moss drove the P99 to victory in a damp International Gold Cup at Oulton Park. In February 1963, the car, having been fitted with a 2.5-litre Climax engine, was driven by Innes Ireland and Graham Hill in the series of off-season races in New Zealand and Australia, including the 1963 Australian Grand Prix at Warwick Farm and the Lakeside International at Lakeside, placing sixth and second respectively. The P99's final competition action during this period came in the British Hillclimb championship in 1964, 1965, and 1966, with Peter Westbury winning the title in 1964. The car has competed in recent years in historic races.

The P99 was later the inspiration for the AWD Ferguson P104 Novi Indycar, which Bobby Unser drove in the Indy 500 in 1964 and 1965. The car was damaged beyond immediate repair in the horrific crash in 1964, and was retired from regular competition in 1965 with engine problems.

In a 1997 interview for Motor Sport magazine, Sir Stirling Moss nominated the P99 as his favourite of all the F1 cars he drove.

Complete Formula One World Championship results
(key)

References

Formula One cars
1961 Formula One season cars
All-wheel-drive vehicles